The Clásico Paceño known as the Bolivian Derby  is considered the most important football derby in the First Bolivian Division, because in this match the two oldest teams of the First Bolivian Division play, the clubs Bolívar and The Strongest, both from the administrative capital of Bolivia, La Paz; hence the name Paceño.

The first official Bolivian derby in history was played on 21 October 1927, they met on the Hippodrome court with a final draw, 2:2. It is the match that has been played in all Bolivian soccer competitions, from amateurism, professionalism, in Bolivian Professional Soccer League, and even in International Tournaments such as Copa Sudamericana and the Copa Libertadores.

In 2014 the Bolivian derby was listed as "one of the 25 most explosive rivalries in the world" by the specialized magazine Football Derbies. The criteria that were used to show the great rivalry between both teams has to do with the game at 3,600 meters high, the time of existence of the classic, the number of games, the importance of duels, the public they carry, the repercussion national and international and even a historical account of the episodes of violence.

Although the confrontations between both rivals date back to the years 1930, the rivalry between these two teams did not become evident until the disappearance of University of La Paz from the foreground of Bolivian football at the end of the years 1960 of the 20th century.

References

External links

La Paz
Club Bolívar
Bolivian football rivalries
 
1927 establishments in Bolivia